This is a list of House of Assembly results for the 2022 South Australian state election.

Summary

Results by electoral district

Adelaide

Badcoe

Black

Bragg

Chaffey

Cheltenham

Colton

Croydon

Davenport

Dunstan

Elder

Elizabeth

Enfield

Finniss

Flinders

Florey

Frome

Gibson

Giles

Hammond

Hartley

Heysen

Hurtle Vale

Kaurna

Kavel

King

Lee

Light

MacKillop

Mawson

Morialta

Morphett

Mount Gambier

Narungga

Newland

Playford

Port Adelaide

Ramsay

Reynell

Schubert

Stuart

Taylor

Torrens

Unley

Waite

West Torrens

Wright

References

Results of South Australian elections